Susan Starr Sered (born 1955) is Professor of Sociology at Suffolk University and Senior Researcher at Suffolk University's Center for Women's Health and Human Rights. Previously, she was the director of the "Religion, Health and Healing Initiative" at the Harvard University Center for the Study of World Religions, and a Professor of Sociology and Anthropology at Bar-Ilan University, Israel. Her interests include both research and advocacy/activism.

Professor Sered works closely with the Massachusetts Women's Justice Network and other organizations advocating for women's human rights and against mass incarceration.

Published works 
Professor Sered is the author of seven books, nearly one hundred scholarly articles, and numerous op-eds and shorter articles focusing on women's health, mass incarceration, and a variety of religious issues.

Professor Sered's work Women of the Sacred Groves was severely criticized by Okinawan Studies related scholars in a "Declaration of Concern" published in issue 54 of the Ryukyuanist.  Professor Sered later submitted "A Response to Critics" in issue 55 of the Ryukyuanist.

Books 

Can’t Catch a Break: Gender, Jail, Drugs, and the Limits of Personal Responsibility. University of California Press (with Maureen Norton-Hawk) (2014).
Uninsured in America: Life and Death in the Land of Opportunity (with Rushika Fernandopulle) (2005)
Women As Ritual Experts: The Religious Lives of Elderly Jewish Women in Jerusalem, New York: Oxford University Press, (1992)
Priestess, Mother, Sacred Sister: Religions Dominated by Women, New York: Oxford University Press, (1994)
Women of the Sacred Groves: Divine Priestesses of Okinawa, New York: Oxford University Press, (1999)
What Makes Women Sick: Maternity, Modesty, and Militarism in Israeli Society, Hanover, NH: Brandeis University Press : University Press of New England, (2000)
Religious healing in Boston : first findings, Ed. Susan Sered and Linda Barnes Cambridge, MA: Center for the Study of World Religions, Harvard University, The Divinity School, (2001)
Religious healing in Boston : reports from the field, Ed. Susan Sered Cambridge, MA: Center for the Study of World Religions, Harvard University, The Divinity School, (2002)
Religious healing in Boston : body, spirit, community, Ed. Susan Sered Cambridge, MA: Center for the Study of World Religions, Harvard University, The Divinity School, (2004)
Religion and healing in America, Ed. Susan Sered and Linda L. Barnes Oxford, New York: Oxford University Press, (2005)

Articles 

2013 (with Maureen Norton-Hawk) “Criminalized Women and the Healthcare System: The Case for Continuity of Services,” Journal of Correctional Health Care 19(3): 164-177.
2012 (with Maureen Norton-Hawk) “Criminalized Women and Twelve Step Programs: Addressing Violations of the Law with a Spiritual Cure,” Implicit Religion 15(1): 37-60.
2011 (with Maureen Norton-Hawk) “Whose Higher Power: Criminalized Women Confront the Twelve Steps,” Feminist Criminology 6 (4): 308-322.
2011 (with Marilyn Delle Donne Proulx) “Lessons for Women's Health from the Massachusetts Reform: Affordability, Transitions and Choice,” Women’s Health Issues 21(1): 1-5.
2008 (with Amy Agigian) “Holistic Sickening: Breast Cancer and the Discursive Worlds of Complementary and Alternative Practitioners,” Sociology of Health and Illness 30(4): 616-631.
2005 Threadbare: Holes in America’s Health Care Safety Net (with Catherine Hoffman), Kaiser Commission on Medicaid and the Uninsured, Washington DC.
2002  “Healing and Religion: A Jewish Perspective,” Yale Journal for Humanities in Medicine, special issue “Spirituality, Religious Wisdom, and Care of the Patient.”
1999 "'You are a Number, Not a Human Being': Israeli Breast Cancer Patients' Experiences with the Medical Establishment," Medical Anthropology Quarterly 13(3): 223-252.
1999  "Talking about Mikveh Parties, or The Discourse of Status, Hierarchy and Social Control" in Rahel Wasserfall, ed. Women and Water: Niddah and Mikveh in Jewish Cultures, UPNE.
1995  "Rachel's Tomb: The Development of a Cult," Jewish Studies Quarterly 2(2): pp. 103–148.
1988  "Food and Holiness: Cooking as a Sacred Act Among Middle-Eastern Jewish Women," Anthropological Quarterly, 61(3): 129-140.

Awards 

 1993: National Jewish Book Award in the Jewish Thought category for Women as Ritual Experts

References

External links
Suffolk University faculty profile page for Susan Sered

1955 births
Living people
20th-century American Jews
Harvard University staff
Suffolk University faculty
Jewish feminists
Jewish scholars
Anthropologists of religion
21st-century American Jews